Hagarty is an Irish surname. Notable people with the surname include:

 John Hawkins Hagarty (1816–1900), Canadian lawyer, teacher and judge
 Lois Sherman Hagarty (born 1948), former Republican member of the Pennsylvania House of Representatives
 Paul Leonard Hagarty (1909–1984), American prelate of the Catholic Church
 Wilbert Hagarty (1888–1963), farmer and political figure in Saskatchewan

See also
 Mike Hagerty (born 1954), American actor 
 Hegarty

References

Surnames
Lists of people by surname
Surnames of Irish origin